Rowena Seymour née Wall (July 1861 - 13 November 1950) was an English noblewoman, philanthropist and wife of Edward Seymour, 16th Duke of Somerset, who was styled as Duchess of Somerset from 22 October 1923.

Early life and education 
Seymour was the daughter of George Wall of Colombo, Ceylon and Mary Anne née Dixon. She was the sister of Arnold and Frank.

Seymour attended Badminton School and Cheltenham Ladies' College.

Marriage and issue 
On 28 July 1881, Seymour married Edward Seymour, 16th Duke of Somerset, a son of the Reverend Francis Payne Seymour, and the great-grandson of Lord Francis Seymour. Together, they had one son: Evelyn Seymour, 17th Duke of Somerset, born on 1 May 1882. Rowena died on 13 November 1950.

References 

1861 births
1950 deaths
19th-century English women
19th-century English people
20th-century English women
20th-century English people
People educated at Cheltenham Ladies' College
People educated at Badminton School
English duchesses by marriage
Rowena
20th-century English landowners
20th-century women landowners
English philanthropists
Wall family